Raghuji Pant is a Nepalese politician, belonging to the Communist Party of Nepal (Unified Marxist-Leninist). He was previously working as a journalist. He is now head of the Publicity Department of CPN(UML). He is also a Central Committee member of CPN(UML).

Pant won the Lalitpur-3 parliamentary seat in the 1994 election and the 1999 election.

In July 2004, he was named Minister of Labour and Transport Management in Sher Bahadur Deuba's cabinet.

In April 2008, he contested the Lalitpur-3 seat in the Constituent Assembly election, but was defeated by the Maoist candidate Pampha Bhusal.

References

Marxist journalists
Nepalese journalists
Living people
Communist Party of Nepal (Unified Marxist–Leninist) politicians
Government ministers of Nepal
Year of birth missing (living people)
Nepal MPs 1999–2002
Nepal MPs 1994–1999
Nepal MPs 2022–present